Malvern Town Football Club is a football club based in Malvern, Worcestershire, England.

History
The club was established in 1946 as Barnards Green Football Club. They joined the Worcester League, where they played until moving up to the Worcestershire Combination in 1955, going on to win the league at the first attempt. The club also won the Worcestershire Junior Cup and retained the trophy for the next two season, before winning it again in 1961–62. In 1967 the Worcestershire Combination was renamed the Midland Combination. The club won the inaugural Worcestershire Senior Urn in 1973–74, before retaining it for the next two seasons; they also finished as runners-up in the Midland Combination in 1973–74.

In 1979 Malvern transferred to the Premier Division of the West Midlands (Regional) League. Despite finishing bottom of the division in 1982–83, the club avoided being relegated. However, they were relegated to Division One at the end of the 1991–92 season. Despite only finishing ninth in Division One in 1993–94, the club were promoted back to the Premier Division. In 2003–04 they won the Premier Division title, earning promotion to the Midland Alliance. A third-place finish in the Alliance in 2005–06 saw the club promoted to Division One Midlands of the Southern League.

Malvern finished bottom of Division One Midlands in 2008–09 and were relegated back to the Midland Alliance. Two seasons later they finished bottom of the Midland Alliance and were relegated to the Premier Division of the West Midlands (Regional) League. The club won the Worcestershire Senior Urn for an eighth time in 2014–15. At the end of the 2018–19 season the club were transferred to Division One West of the Hellenic League. In 2021 they were promoted to the Premier Division based on their results in the abandoned 2019–20 and 2020–21 seasons.

Honours
West Midlands (Regional) League
Premier Division champions 2003–04
Midland Combination
Champions 1955–56
Worcestershire Senior Urn
Winners 1973–74, 1974–75, 1975–76, 1978–79, 1983–84, 1989–90, 1999–2000, 2014–15
Worcestershire Junior Cup
Winners 1955–56, 1956–57, 1957–58, 1961–62
Worcestershire Minor Cup
Winners 1952–53

Records
Best FA Cup performance: Third qualifying round, 1981–82, 1986–87
Best FA Trophy performance: Preliminary round, 2006–07, 2007–08, 2008–09
Best FA Vase performance: Fourth round, 1974–75, 1976–77
Record attendance: 2,006 v Hereford, 7 July 2015
Most appearances: Nick Clayton
Most goals: Graham Buffery

See also
Malvern Town F.C. players
Malvern Town F.C. managers

References

External links
Official website

 
Football clubs in England
Football clubs in Worcestershire
1946 establishments in England
Association football clubs established in 1946
Malvern, Worcestershire
Midland Football Combination
West Midlands (Regional) League
Midland Football Alliance
Southern Football League clubs
Hellenic Football League